Sarna is a place of worship in Chotanagpur region of Jharkhand, Chhattisgarh and Odisha. It is a sacred grove, where people of village gather to perform rituals in village festival.

Ritual
Sarna is scared groove consist of Sal tree called Sarai in Chotanagpur. It is remaintant of forest patch in the village, where spirit reside. According to traditional belief, Sarna is residing place of gaon khut (village deity), the founder of village. Each year people gather to offer sacrifice to Sun, village deity and ancestors for good harvest and safety of village. The village priest in Chotanagpur is known as Pahan, sometimes called Laya. Pahan and his assistant Pujar sacrifice animals especially goat. Then cooked meat is eaten with Tapan (liquor). The ritual of Sarhul festival takes place in Sarna. 

Sarna is place of worship in village of the Sadan and Kurukh of Chotanagpur. Several tribal organization including Santal are demanding separate religious code for Sarna as Sarnaism as they belief it is different from Hinduism. Although Santals call their sacred groves Jaher and village priest Naike.

References 

Sacred groves of India
Veneration of the dead
Nagpuri culture